Gaboto (often referred to as Puerto Gaboto) is a town (comuna) in the southeast of the province of Santa Fe, Argentina.

The town's name is an homage to Sebastian Cabot, one of the first explorers of the area, who established the fort of Sancti Spiritu near Gaboto's location in 1527 — the first Spanish settlement in present-day Argentina.

Gaboto was founded in 1891. It was a site of economical importance due to its port, which has a natural depth of 9 to 11 m, but in the 1930s trade began declining, and the pier was dismantled in 1945. The area is still important as a fishing location for certain species such as the golden dorado (Salminus brasiliensis).

References
 

Populated places in Santa Fe Province
Paraná River